Karel Bulan (born 14 January 1940) is a Czech former sports shooter. He competed at the 1972 Summer Olympics and the 1976 Summer Olympics.

References

External links
 

1940 births
Living people
Czech male sport shooters
Olympic shooters of Czechoslovakia
Shooters at the 1972 Summer Olympics
Shooters at the 1976 Summer Olympics
People from Sušice
Sportspeople from the Plzeň Region
20th-century Czech people